Hearts or Diamonds? is a 1918 American silent mystery film directed by Henry King and starring William Russell, Charlotte Burton, and Howard Davies.

Cast
 William Russell as Larry Hanrahan 
 Charlotte Burton as Adrienne Gascoyne 
 Howard Davies as Col. Paul Gascoyne 
 Carl Stockdale as Bewley 
 John Gough as Wintermute 
 Robert Klein as Hoskins

References

Bibliography
 Donald W. McCaffrey & Christopher P. Jacobs. Guide to the Silent Years of American Cinema. Greenwood Publishing, 1999.

External links

1918 films
1918 mystery films
American mystery films
Films directed by Henry King
American silent feature films
1910s English-language films
American black-and-white films
Silent mystery films
1910s American films